A hung parliament is a term used in legislatures primarily under the Westminster system to describe a situation in which no single political party or pre-existing coalition (also known as an alliance or bloc) has an absolute majority of legislators (commonly known as members or seats) in a parliament or other legislature. This situation is also known as a balanced parliament, or as a legislature under no overall control (NOC), and can result in a minority government. The term is irrelevant/almost ubiquitous in multi-party systems and proportional representation systems where it is rare for a single party to hold a majority of the seats.

In the Westminster system, in the absence of a clear majority, no party or coalition has an automatic mandate to assume control of the executive — a status usually known in parliamentary systems as "forming (a) government". It is possible that an absolute majority may still be gained through the formation of a new coalition government, or the addition of previously unaffiliated members to a pre-existing coalition. Additionally, a minority government may instead result — that is, the party that has the most members is allowed to form government without an absolute majority, provided that it has the express, ongoing support of unaffiliated members, such as minor parties and/or independent legislators.

Overview
A normal objective of parliamentary systems – especially those requiring responsible government such as the Westminster system – is the formation of a stable government (i.e. ideally one that lasts a full parliamentary term, until the next election would normally be due). This requires a government to be able to muster sufficient votes in parliament to pass motions of confidence and supply, especially motions of no-confidence and budget bills. If such motions fail, they normally result in the dissolution of parliament and a fresh election. In some parliamentary systems, however, a new government may be formed without recourse to an election – if, for example, a minor party holds the balance of power, it may publicly express for the opposition, thereby creating a new majority.

The term "hung parliament" is most often used of parliaments dominated by two major parties or coalitions. General elections in such systems usually result in one party having an absolute majority and thus quickly forming a new government. In most parliamentary systems, a hung parliament is considered exceptional and is often seen as undesirable. In other contexts, a hung parliament may be seen as ideal – for example, if opinions among the voting public are polarised regarding one or more issues, a hung parliament may lead to the emergence of a compromise or consensus.

If a legislature is bicameral, the term "hung parliament" is usually used only with respect to the lower house.

In a multi-party system with legislators elected by proportional representation or a similar systems, it is usually exceptionally rare and difficult for any party to have an absolute majority. Under such situations, hung parliaments are often taken for granted and coalition governments are normal. However, the term may be used to describe an election in which no established coalition wins an outright majority (such as the German federal election of 2005 or the 2018 Italian general election).

History

The term apparently emerged in the United Kingdom, around the time of the 1974 election, by analogy with a hung jury, that is, one unable to reach a verdict. . However, whereas a hung jury results in a mistrial, requiring a new trial, there is no general rule under which the absence of a clear majority requires a fresh election. In recent years, most "hung parliaments" have served their full term.

Australia

Australian parliaments are modelled on the Westminster system, with a hung parliament typically defined as a lack of a lower house parliamentary majority from either the Australian Labor Party or Liberal/National Coalition.

Hung parliaments are rare at the federal level in Australia, as a de facto two-party system, in which the Australian Labor Party competes against a permanent Liberal-National Coalition of the conservative parties, has existed with only brief interruptions since the early 20th century. Prior to 1910, no party had had a majority in the House of Representatives. As a result, there were frequent changes of government, several of which took place during parliamentary terms. Since 1910, when the two-party system was cemented, there have been two hung parliaments, the first in 1940, and the second in 2010. At the 1940 federal election, incumbent Prime Minister Robert Menzies secured the support of the two crossbenchers and continued to govern, but in 1941 the independents switched their support to Labor, bringing John Curtin to power.

Declining support for the major parties in recent times is leading to more non-majoritarian outcomes at elections. At the 2010 federal election, which resulted in an exact 72-72 seat tie between Labor and the Liberal-National Coalition, incumbent Prime Minister Julia Gillard secured the support of four out of six Independent and Green Party crossbenchers and continued to govern.

In the 2016 federal election a hung parliament was only narrowly averted with the Liberal-National Coalition winning 76 seats, the bare minimum required to form a majority government. The Liberal-National Coalition government lost its majority government status after a by-election in 2018.

Hung parliaments are rather more common at a state level. The Tasmanian House of Assembly and the unicameral Parliament of the Australian Capital Territory are both elected by Hare-Clark proportional representation, thus, elections commonly return hung parliaments. In other states and territories, candidates contest single-member seats. With far fewer seats than federal parliament, hung parliaments are more likely to be elected. Recent examples include New South Wales in 1991, Queensland in 1998 and 2015, Victoria in 1999, South Australia in 1997 and 2002, Western Australia in 2008, the Australian Capital Territory in 2008, and Tasmania in 2010.

Canada

Hung parliaments at either the federal and provincial level are an infrequent but not unusual occurrence in Canada. Hung Parliaments are commonly referred to as minority governments. Five of the previous seven recent federal elections have resulted in hung parliaments (the 38th, the 39th, the 40th, the 43rd, and the 44th). Following all five elections the largest party ruled as a "minority government". Although Canadian minority governments have tended to be short-lived, the two successive minorities under Prime Minister Stephen Harper managed to hold on to power from February 2006 until a no confidence vote in March 2011. The subsequent election saw a majority parliament elected with Harper's Conservative Party obtaining a 24-seat majority.

While most Canadian minority governments end in dissolution via non-confidence or a snap election call, there have been recent attempts to transition to a new government without returning to the ballot box. Most notably, the 2008 Canadian Federal Election resulted in the 2008–09 Canadian parliamentary dispute. While the Conservative Party had a plurality of seats, the Liberal Party and New Democratic Party, supported by The Bloc Québécois, agreed to defeat the Conservatives in favour of a Liberal/NDP coalition government. On 4 December 2008, Governor General Michaëlle Jean granted Prime Minister Stephen Harper a prorogation on the condition that parliament reconvene early in the new year. The first session of the 40th parliament thus ended, delaying and ultimately avoiding a vote of non-confidence.

At the territorial level, a unique situation happened in the 2021 Yukon general election, in which the electoral district of Vuntut Gwitchin resulted in a tie. A judicial recount was held and the tie remained. A draw was held between the two candidates which ultimately named NDP challenger Annie Blake the winner against incumbent Liberal cabinet minister and MLA Pauline Frost. This victory ultimately resulted in a hung parliament in the Yukon legislature with the NDP holding the balance of power.

Fiji

The 2022 Fijian general election resulted in a hung parliament, with no party gaining a majority of seats. Although the FijiFirst party, led by then-Prime Minister Frank Bainimarama, won the most seats, the three other parties that won seats (the People's Alliance, the National Federation Party and the Social Democratic Liberal Party) formed a coalition and Sitiveni Rabuka, leader of the People's Alliance, became the subsequent Prime Minister, ending 16 years of Bainimarama's rule.

India

India is a federative multi-party parliamentary democracy with lower and upper houses at both national and sub-national levels.

However, despite having a multi-party system in place, it has witnessed a clear majority parliament for 45 years against its transition to democratic republic being 70 years old.

It has 8 recognized national parties with influence over major parts of India and regional parties with base certain states.

From 1989 to 2014, India had a continuous period of parliaments producing coalition governments, with clearer majorities for the Indian National Congress and Janata Party before this period and for the Bharatiya Janata Party after it. The confidence of Lok Sabha, lower house of Indian Parliament elected in general elections determines the prime minister and ruling party of India.

Hung assemblies within states and alliances between national and regional parties at sub-national level are common.

Ireland
Because Ireland uses PR-STV, it is rare for any one party to have a majority on its own. The last such occasion was in 1977. However, one or other coalitions are known to be possible before and during the election. Therefore, a "hung Dáil" (Dáil Éireann being the lower and most dominant chamber of the Oireachtas/Parliament) in Ireland refers more to the inability of a coalition of parties who traditionally enter government together or would be expected to govern together, from doing so.

The President has no direct role in the formation of governments in the case of a hung parliament. However, he retains the power to convene a meeting of either or both the Dáil and Senate which could become important if there was a government trying to use parliamentary recess to prevent confidence votes and hold onto power. The President may also refuse to dissolve Dáil Eireann and call an election if the Taoiseach loses a vote of confidence, instead giving the other parties a chance to see if they can put together a government without proceeding to another election.

In 2016, Fine Gael and Labour, who had been in government the previous five years, were unable, due to Labour's collapse, to enter government again. Fianna Fáil had enough seats to put together a rainbow government with the other centre-left, hard left parties and independents but negotiations broke down. Fianna Fáil had also promised not to enter coalition with Sinn Féin.

The press began to speculate about a Germany style "Grand Coalition" similar to the Christian Democrats and Social Democrats there. Many members of FF considered FG too right wing to enter coalition with and threatened to leave the party this came to pass. As talks continued on without a new government (the old government, constitutionally, which had just been voted out, remaining in power including ministers who had lost their seats) FF agreed to allow a government to form by abstention. The parliamentary arithmetic fell in such a way that if FF TD's abstained on confidence and supply matters, a FG minority government could, with the support of a group of independents, form a new government. This was agreed in exchange for a number of policy concessions. Once the deal with FF was signed, Taoiseach Enda Kenny conducted talks with the independents and entered government for a second term.

Israel
All parliamentary elections in Israel have resulted in hung parliaments. The Knesset consists of 120 members and the highest number of seats a single faction has ever received was the 56 members Alignment (Ma'arach) got in the October 1969 elections. When the same faction was formed in January 1969 it consisted of 63 members, the only instance to date of a faction with an absolute majority in the Knesset. The lowest number of seats the largest faction has ever received in a Knesset election was 26 members received by One Israel in the 1999 Israeli general election.

Malaysia
The 2022 general election of Malaysia resulted in a hung parliament with no party or party coalition winning a simple majority for the first time in Malaysian history. Following five days of deliberation and negotiations within coalitions and parties, the Yang di-Pertuan Agong of Malaysia swore in Pakatan Harapan (PH) chairman Anwar Ibrahim, whose coalition won the most seats, as the tenth Prime Minister of Malaysia on 24 November 2022. To achieve a parliamentary majority, Pakatan Harapan formed a grand coalition government with Barisan Nasional (BN), Gabungan Parti Sarawak (GPS), Gabungan Rakyat Sabah (GRS) and various independent parties.

New Zealand

Hung parliaments had a relatively uncommon place in New Zealand politics prior to the introduction of proportional representation in 1993. Only on four occasions since the beginnings of party politics in 1890 had a hung parliament occurred under the first-past-the-post system: in 1911, 1922, 1928 and 1931. The rarity between 1936 and 1996 was due to the regression into a two-party system, alternating between the long dominating New Zealand Labour Party and New Zealand National Party. From the first MMP election in 1996 until the 2020 election no single party gained an outright majority in parliament. The 2020 election was the first to return a majority – a narrow majority for the Labour Party – since 1993.

United Kingdom

In the United Kingdom, before World War I, a largely stable two-party system existed for generations; traditionally, only the Tories and Whigs, or from the mid-19th century the Conservative and Liberal parties, managed to deliver Members of Parliament in significant numbers. Hung parliaments were thus rare, especially during the 19th century. The possibility of change arose when, in the aftermath of the Act of Union, 1800, a number of Irish MPs took seats in the House, though initially these followed the traditional alignments. However, two Reform Acts (in 1867 and in 1884) significantly extended the franchise and redrew the constituencies, and coincided with a change in Irish politics. Following the 1885 general election, neither party had an overall majority. The Irish Parliamentary Party held the balance of power and made Irish Home Rule a condition of their support. However, the Liberal Party split on the issue of Irish Home Rule, leading to another general election in 1886, in which the Conservatives won the most seats and governed with the support of the fragment of Liberalism opposed to Home Rule, the Liberal Unionist Party.

Both the election of January 1910, and that of December 1910 produced a hung parliament with an almost identical number of seats won by the governing Liberal Party and the Conservative Party. This was due both to the constitutional crisis and to the rise of the Labour Party. The elections of 1929 resulted in the last hung parliament for many years; in the meantime, Labour had replaced the Liberals as one of the two dominating parties.

Since the elections of 1929, three general elections have resulted in hung parliaments in the UK. The first was the election in February 1974, and the ensuing parliament lasted only until October. The second was the May 2010 election, the result of which was a hung parliament with the Conservative party as the largest single party. The results for the 3 main parties were: Conservatives 306, Labour 258, Liberal Democrats 57. The third one resulted from the snap election held in June 2017 that had been called for by Theresa May in order to strengthen her majority heading into Brexit negotiations later in 2017. However, this election backfired on May and her Conservative Party, resulting in a hung parliament after the snap election.

The formation of the coalition resulting from the 2010 election led to the Fixed-term Parliaments Act 2011, which instituted fixed five-year Parliaments and transferred the power to call early elections from the Prime Minister to Parliament itself. This was the idea of the Deputy Prime Minister Nick Clegg, then the leader of the Liberal Democrats, who said that this would stop the Prime Minister and leader of the Conservative Party, David Cameron, from calling a snap election to end the hung parliament, as many other Conservatives had requested.

Hung parliaments can also arise when slim government majorities are eroded by by-election defeats and defection of Members of Parliament to opposition parties, as well as resignations of MPs from the House of Commons. This happened in December 1996 to the Conservative government of John Major (1990–97) and in mid-1978 to the Labour government of James Callaghan (1976–79); this latter period covers the era known as the Winter of Discontent. The minority government of Jim Callaghan came when Labour ended their 15-month Lib–Lab pact with the Liberals having lost their majority in early 1977.

According to researchers Andrew Blick and Stuart Wilks-Heeg, the phrase "hung parliament" did not enter into common usage in the UK until the mid-1970s. It was first used in the press by journalist Simon Hoggart in The Guardian in 1974.

Academic treatments of hung parliaments include David Butler's Governing Without a Majority: Dilemmas for Hung Parliaments in Britain (Sheridan House, 1986) and Vernon Bogdanor's 'Multi-Party Politics and the Constitution' (Cambridge University Press, 1983).

Consequences
In countries used to decisive election outcomes, a hung parliament is often viewed as an unfavourable outcome, leading to relatively weak and unstable government. A period of uncertainty after the election is common, as major party leaders negotiate with independents and minor parties to establish a working majority.

An aspiring head of government may seek to build a coalition government; in Westminster systems, this typically involves agreement on a joint legislative programme and a number of ministerial posts going to the minor coalition partners, in return for a stable majority. Alternatively, a minority government may be formed, establishing confidence and supply agreements in return for policy concessions agreed in advance, or relying on case by case support.

Australia
In the Western Australian state election of 2008 the Australian Labor Party won more seats than the Liberal Party at 28 to 24. The National Party along with three independents had the seats needed to give either party a majority. To help the Liberal Party form government, the Nationals supported the party on the condition that the Royalties for Regions policy was implemented.

In the 1999 Victorian state election, the Labor Party won 42 seats, while the incumbent Liberal National Coalition retained 43, with 3 seats falling to independents. The Labor Party formed a minority government with the 3 independents.

The 2010 Tasmanian state election resulted in a hung parliament. After a period of negotiation, the incumbent Labor government led by David Bartlett was recommissioned, but containing the Leader of the Tasmanian Greens, Nick McKim, as a minister, and the Greens' Cassy O'Connor as Cabinet Secretary.

In the 2010 federal election, neither Labor nor the Liberal coalition secured the majority of seats required to form a Government in their own right. In order to counter the potential instability of minority government involved groups may negotiate written agreements defining their terms of support. Such measures were undertaken by the Gillard Government in 2010.

India
In India if an election results in a 'hung assembly' in one of the state Legislative Assemblies and no party is capable of gaining confidence then fresh elections are announced to be held as soon as possible. Until this occurs President's Rule is applied. In India there have been many situations of hung assemblies in the state legislatures. However, invariably, the President of India in the case of Lok Sabha elections and the Governor of the state concerned, in the case of state elections, would attempt to give opportunities to the parties, starting with the one that got the maximum number of seats in the elections, to explore possibilities of forming a coalition government, before bringing in President's Rule.

New Zealand
The first such occasion was in 1911 when the Liberal Party won fewer seats than the opposition Reform Party despite tallying the most votes. A vote of no confidence was placed by Reform and the Liberals survived by just one vote. This prompted Prime Minister Sir Joseph Ward to resign, his replacement Thomas Mackenzie was later defeated in July 1912 in a vote with several MPs and Labour crossing the floor to vote with the opposition, the last time in New Zealand history a government has changed on a confidence vote. This broke 23 years of Liberal governance and William Massey formed a new Reform Party government. Massey governed through to his death in 1925, though in 1922 the Reform Party suffered major losses and Massey was forced negotiate with several Independent MPs to retain power.

In 1928, Reform were ousted from governance and Joseph Ward once again won back power. However, the Reform and United (Liberal) parties were tied on seats with Labour holding the balance of power. Labour chose to back Ward rather than let Reform leader Gordon Coates remain in office. In the next election in 1931, there was again a three-way deadlock. On this occasion the Reform and United parties became a coalition government out of mutual fear of Labour's ever-increasing appeal as the Great Depression worsened.

1993 was the last time a hung parliament occurred in New Zealand. Governor-General Dame Catherine Tizard asked Sir David Beattie to form a committee, along with three retired appeal court judges, to decide whom to appoint as Prime Minister. 
 However, National won an extra seat after special votes were counted, giving National 50 seats and Labour 45 seats (4 were won by third party candidates). Labour's Sir Peter Tapsell agreed to become Speaker of the New Zealand House of Representatives. As a result, National did not lose a vote in the house and maintained a dubious majority for three years.

United Kingdom
In the February 1974 general election, no party gained an overall parliamentary majority. Labour won the most seats (301, which was 17 seats short of an overall majority) with the Conservatives on 297 seats, although the Conservatives had a larger share of the popular vote. As the incumbent Prime Minister, Edward Heath remained in office attempting to build a coalition with the Liberals. When these negotiations were unsuccessful Heath resigned and Labour led by Harold Wilson took over in a minority government.

In the 2010 UK general election, another hung parliament occurred with the Conservatives as the largest party, and discussions followed to help create a stable government. This resulted in agreement on a coalition government, which was also a majority government, between the Conservative Party, which won the most votes and seats in the election, and the Liberal Democrats.

In the 2017 UK general election, a hung parliament occurred for the second time in seven years with the Conservatives again being the largest party. The Conservatives led by Theresa May formed a minority government, supported by a confidence-and-supply agreement with the Northern Ireland's Democratic Unionist Party.

Working majority
There have been occasions when, although a parliament or assembly is technically hung, the party in power has a working majority. For example, in the United Kingdom, the tradition is that the Speaker and Deputy Speakers do not vote and Sinn Féin MPs never take their seats per their policy of abstentionism, so these members can be discounted from the opposition numbers.

United Kingdom
In 2005, this was the case in the 60-seat National Assembly for Wales, where Labour lost their majority when Peter Law was expelled for standing against the official candidate in the 2005 Westminster election in the Blaenau Gwent constituency. When the Assembly was first elected on 1 May 2003, Labour won 30 seats, Plaid Cymru won 12, the Conservatives won 11, Liberal Democrats won 6, and the John Marek Independent Party won a seat.

When Dafydd Elis-Thomas (Plaid Cymru) was reelected as the presiding officer, this reduced the number of opposition AMs who could vote to 29, as the presiding officer votes only in the event of a tie and, even then, not on party political lines but according to Speaker Denison's rule. Thus, Labour had a working majority of one seat until Law ran in Blaenau Gwent.

See also
 Coalition government
 Cohabitation (government)
 Divided government
 Minority government

Notes

References

External links

United Kingdom
Charter 2010 – planning for a hung parliament
Hang Em – a pressure group
Hung parliament news , New Statesman
Hung parliaments: What you need to know, Institute for Government (2010)
Q&A: What is a hung parliament?, BBC News (8 March 2010)

Westminster system
Minority governments